Jackie Cox is the stage name of Darius Rose, (born April 10, 1985) a Canadian drag queen based in New York City, known for being a competitor on the twelfth season of RuPaul's Drag Race and ultimately placing fourth in the competition.

Early life 
Rose was born in Halifax, Nova Scotia, to a Canadian father and an Iranian mother. He attended UCLA School of Theater, Film and Television to study theatre and upon graduating with his Bachelor of Arts degree, he moved to New York with the goal of doing theatre professionally.

Career 
In 2002, Rose transferred to University High School in Irvine where he starred in productions of Dark of the Moon, Les Miserables and Bat Boy the musical. In 2003 he was crowned Prom King as an openly gay student. In 2009, Rose discovered drag. He played the title role in a production of Hedwig and the Angry Inch at Theatre Out at the Empire Theater, in Santa Ana, CA which was his first foray into drag. His first performance as Jackie Cox was at a competition called So You Think You Can Drag at New World Stages in New York. His drag name originated from a nickname that he and a friend, in high school, assigned to a girl that they disliked but wanted to be able to talk about her in public. As her initials were “J.C.”, they came up with “Jackie Cox” as a codename.

Jackie was announced as a cast member on season 12 of RuPaul’s Drag Race on January 23, 2020. She is the second Canadian contestant on the US version of the show, and the oldest performer on Season 12. Jackie became the first contestant in Drag Race history to dress in a Muslim-inspired outfit on episode 9 of the show, which had a "stars and stripes" patriotic theme. She wore a red-striped kaftan with a blue hijab outlined with 50 silver stars. Guest judge Jeff Goldblum subsequently came under fire for his comments over Jackies’s hijab outfit, when asking, "Is there something in this religion that is anti-homosexuality and anti-woman? Does that complicate the issue?" for which he has been widely criticized. On the same episode, even though Jackie was praised for her choices, she found herself in the bottom two for the first time in the season and had to lip sync against competitor Widow Von’Du to Katy Perry’s "Firework". Jackie was successful and Von’Du was eliminated.

Jackie Cox appeared on the soap opera Days of Our Lives on April 20, 2022. Chad helped Jackie to crash the wedding of Leo Stark to Dr. Craig Wesley, and announced that Leo was already married to her. He also appeared out of drag, as himself, Darius Rose. Leo claimed that he and Darius were only married to help Darius get a green card. Darius then stunned the wedding party by telling them that Leo and Craig's relationship has been "one big flim-flam," based on the money and prestige Leo believed the marriage would bring by marrying a doctor.

Filmography

Television

Web series

Music videos

Discography

Singles

Featured singles

See also
 LGBT culture in New York City
 List of LGBT people from New York City

References

External links

Jackie Cox Facebook Account

1985 births
Living people
Canadian drag queens
Canadian people of Iranian descent
People from Halifax, Nova Scotia
People from New York City
Jackie Cox
UCLA Film School alumni
21st-century Canadian LGBT people